Chris Conrad is an American actor. He is best known for his roles as Jason in Young Hercules, Dennis McClaren in Patriot, and Eric McGowen in The Next Karate Kid.

Career
Conrad spent a year studying at the Piven Theatre Workshop, then signed with an agent and moved to Los Angeles with his brother Steven, who was in the process of selling the script for Wrestling Ernest Hemingway. His early movie roles were in Airborne and The Next Karate Kid. His breakout television role was in the 1998 series Young Hercules, in which he appeared in 37 episodes as Young Jason.

In 2000, Conrad returned home to Florida to finish college, he graduated from Florida Atlantic University with a bachelor's degree in history. He then taught high school and coached football but returned to Los Angeles in 2005 to pursue acting. He returned to television with a one-time appearances in Bones and Criminal Minds.

He has appeared in some of his brother's productions, including Patriot and Perpetual Grace, LTD.

Conrad originally was cast as Adrian Chase / Vigilante for the streaming series Peacemaker, the first DC Extended Universe television show. However, he left the series over creative differences after filming five-and-a-half episode; director James Gunn recast the role with Freddie Stroma, reshooting or redubbing all of Conrad's scenes.

Personal life
In his free time, Conrad trains in kickboxing, wrestling, and Brazilian jiu-jitsu; he holds a purple belt in Machado jiu-jitsu.

Filmography

Film

Television

References

External links
 

American male actors
Living people
Male actors from Fort Lauderdale, Florida
Year of birth missing (living people)
Florida State University alumni